L'Étoile is a commune in the Somme department in Hauts-de-France in northern France.

Geography

Population

Places of interest
The Benedictine abbey : Abbaye de Moreaucourt

See also
Communes of the Somme department

References

External links

 L'Étoile on the Quid website 
 Personal site about L’Étoile by Ghislain Lancel

Communes of Somme (department)